Newport Municipal Airport may refer to:

 Newport Municipal Airport (Oregon) in Newport, Oregon, United States (FAA: ONP)
 Newport Municipal Airport (Arkansas) in Newport, Arkansas, United States (FAA: M19)

See also 

 Newport State Airport (disambiguation)